Langstaff could mean one of the following:

Places

Ontario, Canada
Langstaff, Ontario, a community shared between Vaughan, Ontario and Markham, Ontario
Langstaff GO Station, a station in the GO Transit network located in the community
York Regional Road 72, known commonly as Langstaff Road Back in 1966.

Schools
Langstaff Secondary School, a public high school in Richmond Hill, Ontario, Canada

People
James Henry Langstaff (1956), Bishop of Lynn (2004–2010), Bishop of Rochester (2010– )
James Langstaff Bowman (1879–1951), first Speaker of the Canadian House of Commons from Manitoba
James Miles Langstaff (1825–1889), reeve of Richmond Hill
John Langstaff (1920–2005), a concert baritone
Stuart Langstaff, Green Party candidate in 2004 Canadian federal election
Macaulay Langstaff, an English professional footballer

See also
 Longstaff (disambiguation)